= Green microfinance =

Green microfinance is a financial service which tries to improve the environmental conditions by creating incentives for the poor. It provides the poor with microfinance that encourages them to use more sustainable environmental-friendly practices.
